Nicholas Monro (born London, 1936) is an English pop art sculptor, print-maker and art teacher. He is known for being one of the few British pop artists to work in sculpture and is known for his use of fibreglass.

Life and work
Monro studied art at the Chelsea School of Art from 1958 to 1961. After graduating he began teaching at Swindon School of Art, then returned to Chelsea School of Art in 1968.

In 1969 he received an Arts Council Award and was included in the exhibition Pop Art Re-Assessed at the Hayward Gallery.

In the early 1970s, he had a studio at Hungerford.

Public collections 

Monro's works are in the collections of the Berardo Collection Museum, Tate Modern and Wolverhampton Art Gallery.

Key works 

 Money Bags, painted fibreglass (1965)
 Flock of Sheep, painted fibreglass, (1968) – now in a private collection in Wuppertal, Germany
 Statue of King Kong, painted fibreglass, (1972)
 The Sand Dancers (a statue of Wilson, Keppel and Betty), made for the Sands Hotel, Edinburgh, now part of the Treadwell Collection.
 Bust of Max Wall, painted fibreglass, sold for £6,875 ($11,323) at Christie's, London, on 23 August 2011
 Statue of Eric Morecambe & Ernie Wise, in painted fibreglass, commissioned in 1977 by the Arts Council, this statue was to form part of the British Genius exhibition at Battersea Park, London

References

External links 

 Film interview with Monro filmed by ATV in Birmingham, in 1972
 Monro prints in the Rose and Chris Prater gift, at Tate

1936 births
British pop artists
English sculptors
English male sculptors
Alumni of Chelsea College of Arts
British art teachers
20th-century English educators
Living people
People from Hungerford